Grits & Soul is the eighth studio album by American musician James Brown. The album was released in 1964, by Smash Records.

Track listing
All tracks composed by James Brown as "Ted Wright"; except where indicated

Personnel
James Brown - vocals, piano, organ
Les Buie - guitar
Bernard Odum, Sam Thomas - bass
Al Lucas "Fats" Gonder - piano, organ
Melvin Parker, Nat Kendrick, O.B. Williams - drums
Al Brisco Clark, Eldee Williams, St. Clair Pinckney - tenor saxophone
Maceo Parker - baritone saxophone
Nat Jones - alto saxophone, arrangements
Joe Dupars, Mack Johnson, Robert Knight, Ron Tooley - trumpet
Wilmer Milton - trombone

References

1964 albums
James Brown albums
Albums produced by James Brown
Smash Records albums